Rahamim Melamed–Cohen (1937–2020) was a prominent Israeli educator who gained secondary fame as an artist and author after being stricken by Lou Gehrig's disease.

References

External links
 Rahamim Melamed Cohen: "Hooked to Machine, Hooked on Life", Haaretz, 22 September 2002

1937 births
2020 deaths